Paul Revere & the Raiders are an American rock band from Boise, Idaho. Formed in 1958, the band released their first hit single three years later, "Like, Long Hair", which reached number 38 on the U.S. Billboard Hot 100 chart. 
Following a few minor charting singles, including a version of "Louie Louie", the band worked with producer Terry Melcher in updating their sound, combining fast-paced, guitar-and-vocal-dominated rock and roll with an intimidating R&B flavor. 
The result was a string of commercially successful singles, beginning with 1965's "Steppin' Out" and continuing with "Just Like Me", which reached number 11 on the Hot 100, as well as "Kicks", "Hungry", and "Good Thing", all of which peaked inside the top 10. In addition, the band's three 1966 studio albums—Just Like Us!, Midnight Ride, and The Spirit of '67—were each certified gold in the United States.

The band's popularity began to wane during the late 1960s, but in 1971 they released their first U.S. number one single, "Indian Reservation", a song written by John D. Loudermilk. However, the band did not duplicate the song's success with any subsequent singles, and by 1975 Columbia Records abandoned the group.

Studio albums

Notes
1 Canada's RPM album chart dates back to 1968.

Compilation albums

Live albums

Singles

Notes

References

Discographies of American artists
Rock music group discographies